The Best Moment ESPY Award has been conferred annually since 2001 on the moment or series of moments transpiring in a play in a single game or individual match or event, across a single regular season or playoff game, or across a season, irrespective of specific sport, contested, in all cases, professionally under the auspices of one of the four major leagues in the united States and Canada, collegiately under the auspices of the National Collegiate Athletic Association, or internationally under the auspices of a sport federation, adjudged to the most remarkable or best in a given calendar year; the primary participant in the moment is generally regarded as the award's recipient.

Between 2001 and 2004, the award voting panel comprised variously fans; sportswriters and broadcasters, sports executives, and retired sportspersons, termed collectively experts; and ESPN personalities, but balloting thereafter has been exclusively by fans over the Internet from amongst choices selected by the ESPN Select Nominating Committee.  In 2001, the ESPY Awards ceremony was conducted in February and awards conferred reflected performance and achievement over the twelve months previous to presentation; since 2002, awards have been presented in July to reflect performance and achievement also over a twelve-month period. There was no voting in 2015, 2016, and 2017, but the 2018 winner was determined by voting. There was no voting in 2019.

List of winners

Notes

References

ESPY Awards